R. Nelson Snider High School is a secondary school in the Fort Wayne Community Schools system, serving the north central and northeast neighborhoods of Fort Wayne, Indiana, United States.

A small portion of New Haven is zoned to Snider.

Athletics

All athletic teams compete in the Summit Athletic Conference.

Team state champions 
 Boys' baseball:
 Class 4A - 2008/09, 2005/06
 Girls' basketball:
 1987/88
 Boys' football:
 Class 5A - 1992/93, 2015/2016
 Boys' track and field:
 1973/74 (co-champions)
 Girls' volleyball:
 1991/92, 1987/88

Speech and debate 
Snider's speech club is a chapter of the National Forensic League, the Indiana High School Forensic Association, and actively participates in its events.

Notable alumni 

 Jessie Bates professional football player, Cincinnati Bengals
 Vaughn Dunbar, former professional football player, NFL, New Orleans Saints
 Tiffany Gooden, former professional basketball player, Colorado Xplosion
 Andy Replogle, former professional baseball player, Milwaukee Brewers
 Zuzanna Szadkowski, actress 
 Matt Vogel, swimmer, Olympic gold medalist, 1976 Summer Olympics
 Sharon Wichman, swimmer, Olympic gold medalist, 1968 Summer Olympics
 Rod Woodson, former professional football player, Pro Football Hall of Famer

See also
 List of high schools in Indiana
 Summit Athletic Conference

References

External links 
 Snider High School

Snider High School
Schools in Fort Wayne, Indiana
Educational institutions established in 1964
1964 establishments in Indiana